Raptors Knoll Disc Golf Course is an 18-hole disc golf course located in the Township of Langley, British Columbia, Canada. The course was designed by Chris Hartmann and Stewart McIsack in 2019. It ranks among the highest-rated disc golf courses in the world.

See also 
List of disc golf courses in British Columbia

References

External links 

 
 Course map
 DG Course Review profile
 PDGA Course Directory profile
 

Disc golf courses in British Columbia